The World Group II Play-offs were four ties which involved the losing nations of the World Group II and four nations from the three Zonal Group I competitions. Nations that won their play-off ties entered the 2018 World Group II, while losing nations joined their respective zonal groups.

Italy vs. Chinese Taipei

Romania vs. Great Britain

Serbia vs. Australia

Canada vs. Kazakhstan

References 

World Group II Play-offs